Club de Fútbol Gandía is a Spanish football team based in Gandia, in the autonomous community of Valencia. Founded in 1947 it plays in Tercera Federación, holding home matches at Estadio Guillermo Olagüe, with a capacity of 6,000 seats.

Season to season

13 seasons in Segunda División B
43 seasons in Tercera División
1 season in Tercera División RFEF

Famous players
Note: this list includes players that have played at least 100 league games and/or have reached international status.
 Raúl Bravo (youth)

External links
Official website 
Futbolme team profile 

Association football clubs established in 1947
Football clubs in the Valencian Community
1947 establishments in Spain
Gandia
CF Gandía